Edward Scicluna (born October 12, 1946 in Rabat, Malta) is a Maltese economist and politician. Scicluna assumed the position of Governor of the Central Bank of Malta as from 1st January 2021 for a five-year term.

Biography

Education and private life
Scicluna holds a Diploma in social studies from the Plater College, Oxford (1972)  and degrees in economics from the University of Malta (BA, 1975) and the University of Toronto (MA, 1976, and PhD, 1982). Between 1981 and 1990 he was professor and head of the Department of Economics at the University of Malta where he still holds a lectureship post.

Scicluna is married with two children.

Professional career 
Scicluna has held a number of posts in the public and private sector. He served as Chairman of the Malta Council of Economic and Social Development (MCESD) (1999–2003) and of the Malta Financial Services Authority (MFSA) (1997–99), an Electoral Commissioner (1987–93), a Director of the Central Bank of Malta (1996–2003) and a member of Malta's National Euro Change-over Committee (NECC) (2005–2008). He was often selected by the Malta Broadcasting Authority to chair broadcast political debates. In the private sector he was Chairman of the HSBC Malta Bond Fund (since 2002) and of CWG plc and director of MIB Ltd. 
 
Internationally he served on the Council of Europe's Development Bank Auditing Committee (1997–2000) and carried out consultancy and advisory work for the European Commission (particularly on the single currency), UNESCO, the United Nations Environmental Programme (UNEP) (1987–97), the IMF delegation, the governments of Albania, Croatia, Libya and Turkey and a number of credit rating agencies.

 European Stability Mechanism (ESM), Member of the Board of Governors
 Asian Infrastructure Investment Bank (AIIB), Ex-Officio Member of the Board of Governors
 International Monetary Fund (IMF), Ex-Officio Member of the Board of Governors

Political career

Member of the European Parliament, 2009–2013
Scicluna joined the Labour Party in 2009 and was elected MEP at the 2009 European Parliament election in Malta. He was appointed Vice-Chairman of the Committee on Economic and Monetary Affairs, member of the delegation to the ACP–EU Joint Parliamentary Assembly and substitute member on the Committee on the Environment, Public Health and Food Safety and the delegation for relations with the countries of Southeast Asia and the Association of Southeast Asian Nations (ASEAN).

Minister of Finance, 2013–2020
Scicluna was then elected MP for the Labour Party at the 2013 Maltese general election. On 13 March 2013 he was appointed Finance Minister in the new Labour government of PM Joseph Muscat.

Scicluna, along with then-Health Minister Konrad Mizzi and Chris Cardona, is subject of a magisterial inquiry over the deal with Vitals Global Healthcare.

Governor of Malta's Central Bank 

Scicluna assumed the position of Governor of the Central Bank of Malta as from 1st January 2021 for a five-year term.

References

External links

 
 

1946 births
Labour Party (Malta) MEPs
Living people
Maltese Roman Catholics
MEPs for Malta 2009–2014
People from Rabat
Finance Ministers of Malta
21st-century Maltese politicians
Governors of the Central Bank of Malta